Roydon Island is an island, with an area of 37 ha, in south-eastern Australia.  It is part of Tasmania’s Pasco Island Group, lying in eastern Bass Strait off the north-west coast of Flinders Island in the Furneaux Group.

Fauna
Seabirds and waders recorded as breeding on the island include little penguin, short-tailed shearwater, Pacific gull and sooty oystercatcher.  The metallic skink and White's skink are present.

See also

 List of islands of Tasmania

References

Furneaux Group